John Jennings may refer to:

Politicians
 John Jenyns (1660–1717), MP
 John Jennings (Burton MP) (1903–1990), British Conservative Party politician
 John Jennings (American politician) (1880–1956), U.S. Representative from Tennessee, 1939–1951
 John Jennings (Australian politician) (1878–1968), federal member for South Sydney and then Watson in the 1930s
 Jack Jennings (politician) (John Joseph Jennings, 1923–1995), member for the electoral district of Ross Smith, 1970–1977
 John Jennings (St Albans MP) (died 1642), English Member of Parliament

Musicians
 John Jennings (musician) (1953–2015), American guitarist, multi-instrumentalist and producer
 John Jennings, bassist for British band The Ruts

Military
 John Jennings (Royal Navy officer) (1664–1743), British admiral and politician
 John Jennings, British soldier who played a major part in the Battle of Carrickfergus

Others
 John Edward Jennings (1906–1973), American historical novelist
 John T. Jennings, president of the Royal Society of South Australia, 2008–2010
 Sir John Jennings (businessman) (born 1937), British oil industry executive officer, Chancellor of Loughborough University, 2003–2010
 John Jennings (clergyman) (1814–1876), Canadian Presbyterian minister
 John Jennings (footballer) (1905–1997), English footballer for Cardiff City, Middlesbrough and Preston
 John Jennings (physician) (fl. 18th century), Irish doctor
 John Jennings (tutor) (1688–1723), English dissenting tutor
 John Jennings (priest) (died 1883), Archdeacon of Westminster
 John Percival Jennings, horticultural adviser for the South Australian Department of Agriculture
 John Jennings (racing driver), participated in 1970 Greenville 200
 Midgley John Jennings (1806–1857), English missionary, founder of the SPG Mission to Delhi
 John C.T. Jennings, fictional hero of the Jennings books

See also 
 John Gennings (c. 1570–1660), biographer of his brother, Edward Gennings, 17th Century martyr
 Jonathan Jennings (1784–1834), governor and congressman